FRA10AC1 is a protein that in humans is encoded by the FRA10AC1 gene.

Function 

The protein encoded by this gene is a nuclear phosphoprotein of unknown function. The 5' UTR of this gene is part of a CpG island and contains a tandem CGG repeat region that normally consists of 8-14 repeats but can expand to over 200 repeats. The expanded allele becomes hyper-methylated and is not transcribed; however, an expanded repeat region has not been associated with any disease phenotype. This gene is found within the rare FRA10A folate-sensitive fragile site.

References

Further reading